Quincy David "Quin" Epperly (March 3, 1913 – January 7, 2001) was an American racing car constructor. He was born in Floyd, Virginia, to John Wesley and Iowa Texas Epperly.  After completing a correspondence course in "Theory of Aircraft Construction", Epperly moved to Southern California in 1940 to work for Lockheed and Pacific Airmotive. During the war, he joined the Coast Guard Reserve to spend evenings after work on watch at the Wilmington Coast Guard Patrol Base. 

In the late 1940s, he went to work for Frank Kurtis building racing car bodies; this led to a lifelong career in the racing business.

During the mid-1950s Epperly opened his own shop in Lawndale, CA, where he came up with a radical approach in racing car design, by placing the four-cylinder  Offenhauser engine on its side, rather than in the upright position, as was the usual custom for the Indy roadsters of that era.  Called the "laydown Offy", it allowed for better high-speed aerodynamics and oval-track weight distribution.

He also built the body for the first Spirit of America land speed racer, out of his shop in Gardena, California. 

Epperly worked with Nye Frank and Craig Breedlove on the dragster Spirit II in 1964,  and with Frank on the Flying Wedge streamliner dragster built for Don Prudhomme in 1971.

Perhaps his most notable restoration was the engine for the Cooper Type 54-Climax, which, in the hands of Jack Brabham, began the "rear engine revolution" at Indianapolis.  The restoration earned the car the coveted Monterey Cup at the 1991 Monterey Historic races, when, driven again by Sir Jack, it performed perfectly. It has since traveled to the Festival of Speed at Goodwood in 1993, to Australia in 1995 for the CART Surfer's Paradise race, to Michigan International Raceway in 1996 for the U.S. 500 (where demonstration laps at around 140 mph were made), and to the California Speedway in 1997 for the Marlboro 500. 

His last major project was to complete the body restoration of his own Demler Special #99 in 1998. The Demler had finished second in the 1958 Indianapolis 500.

World Championship Indy 500 results

References

External links
 Tribute to Quincy D. Epperly

Formula One constructors (Indianapolis only)
American racecar constructors